Conrad Centennial Singapore (Chinese：康莱德酒店) is a hotel located in the Downtown Core (near Millenia Tower), Marina Centre, Singapore. The hotel has 512 guest rooms including 25 suites, and 31 floors with two basements. The hotel's carpark is shared with Millenia Walk. Conrad Centennial shares the same laundry services with sister hotel, The Ritz-Carlton Millenia Singapore. Both hotels are owned by the same owner, Pontiac Land (owned by the Kwee brothers).

Rooms

The hotel has 512 guest rooms on 31 floors with 96 sets of connecting rooms and 25 suites

Covid-19 Response 
During the COVID-19 outbreak in Singapore, the hotel served as a dedicated government facility to house returning travelers for their mandated Stay Home Notice (SHN).

References

External links
Official website

Marina Centre
Hotels in Singapore
Hilton Hotels & Resorts hotels
Hotels established in 1996
Hotel buildings completed in 1996
20th-century architecture in Singapore